Ronald Lee Nabakowski (February 15, 1942 - June 10, 2016) was an American politician who served as a member of the Ohio Senate, representing the 13th District from 1977 to 1982. He was previously the Lorain County Clerk of Courts. Nabakowski also served as the Director of the Ohio Lottery.

Nabakowski died on June 10, 2016 at the age of 74 after suffering from Lou gherig's disease.

References

Democratic Party Ohio state senators
1942 births
2016 deaths